Tembaro (Amharic: ጠምባሮ) is one of the woredas in the Southern Nations, Nationalities, and Peoples' Region of Ethiopia. This woreda is named after the inhabiting Tembaro people. A part of the Kembata Tembaro Zone, Tembaro is bordered on the south by the Dawro Zone, on the north by the Hadiya Zone, on the west Hadiya and Dawro on the east by Hadero Tunto, and on the southeast by the Wolayita Zone. Towns in Tembaro include Mudula, Keleta, and Bultuma. Tembaro was also formerly called Omo Sheleko woreda.

Demographics 
Based on the 2007 Census conducted by the CSA, this woreda has a total population of 480,573, of whom 235,334 are men and 245,239 women; 45,615 or 7.21% of its population are urban dwellers. The majority of the inhabitants were Protestants, with 77.69% of the population reporting that belief, 14.9% practiced Ethiopian Orthodox Christianity, 3.36% were Catholic, 2.07% were Muslim, and 1.17% observed traditional beliefs.

Notes 

Districts of the Southern Nations, Nationalities, and Peoples' Region
Tembarana is one of the mother thouing language for Tembaro people
thumb